Enfield Falls Canal (commonly known as the Windsor Locks Canal) is a canal that was built to circumvent the shallows at Enfield Falls (or Enfield Rapids) on the Connecticut River, between Hartford, Connecticut and Springfield, Massachusetts. It is situated along the west side of the river, adjacent to the towns of Suffield and Windsor Locks in Hartford County in the state of Connecticut, United States. Windsor Locks is named after the series of locks on the canal.

History
Prior to the opening of the canal, the scows or flat-bottomed boats which plied the Connecticut River could only ascend the falls by engaging local fallsmen to propel the craft forward utilizing set poles. One fallsman was required for each ton of cargo. Not only did the added labor costs make this method of overtaking the falls expensive, but the amount of cargo that could be transported was limited to approximately ten tons. Any additional freight had to be offloaded at Warehouse Point on the east bank and warehoused for later transport or carried around the falls by ox teams.

Construction of the canal commenced in 1827 and it was opened on November 11, 1829. The canal was unique among canals of the era in that it was designed with structural reinforcement to facilitate steam tug boat traffic. The design of the canal included a massive head gate with apertures that could be opened and closed to precisely control water levels not only within the lock chambers but within the canal itself. The design feature supported the incorporator's dual intent to profit not only from tolls charged on canal traffic but from the sale of mill sites and the leasing of water rights to mill operators along the last mile of the canal bank.

Once the canal was opened, boats were able to carry much larger loads, and the anticipated steamboat services were introduced using newly designed vessels capable of passing through the lock chambers. Charles Dickens traveled along the canal on February 7, 1842. However, by 1844 the Hartford and Springfield Railroad had started operation, and navigation on the Connecticut River gradually reduced. The profits realized from the sale of water rights proved to be the more lucrative of the canal's two purposes.

Today
Today the canal is listed in the National Register of Historic Places, but closed to navigation and privately owned by the Ahlstrom Corporation, which has a manufacturing facility adjacent to the canal. The locks themselves still exist, but have not been usable since the 1970s. The towpath is open for hiking and cycling as the Windsor Locks Canal State Park Trail. The trail is generally open from April 1 through November 15. The southernmost portion of the trail runs parallel to the J. R. Montgomery Company Industrial Complex.

See also

Windsor Locks Canal State Park Trail
J. R. Montgomery Company Industrial Complex
National Register of Historic Places listings in Hartford County, Connecticut

References

External links
windsorlockshistory.com - an on-line listing of books, articles, maps and videos on the history of Windsor Locks, including many on the canal.
Windsor Locks Canal State Park Trail Connecticut Department of Energy and Environmental Protection
The Rise and Fall of the Canal and the Factories Along it, by Dr. Melvin D. Montemerlo, July 25, 2016
 The Canal at Windsor Locks Connecticut Heritage (Dorothy A. DeBisschop).  Retrieved January 20, 2006.

Canals in Connecticut
Bodies of water of Hartford County, Connecticut
Canals on the National Register of Historic Places in Connecticut
Windsor Locks, Connecticut
Transportation buildings and structures in Hartford County, Connecticut
Canals opened in 1829
National Register of Historic Places in Hartford County, Connecticut